The Brazilian Israelite Confederation (Confederação Israelita do Brasil or CONIB) is the central organization of the Brazilian Jewish community. The organization was established in 1948, it gathers 14 state federations with some 200 institutions, serving as the community's political representative. The political activities undertaken by CONIB are one of the few national coordination efforts by the organized Jewish community in Brazil.

Activities
CONIB represents the Jewish population of Brazil which they estimate to be approximately 120,000. CONIB openly professes to be an institution that is pro-Israel and Zionist. The organization sees its role to mediate between the Brazilian Jewish community (14 states have Jewish federations) and the executive, legislative and judiciary branches of power in Brazil.

in 2012, CONIB launched a national essay contest about Anne Frank.

People
Fernando Lottenberg is the president of the Brazilian Israelite Confederation.

References

External links

Jews and Judaism in Brazil
Jewish organizations established in 1948
1948 establishments in Brazil
Zionism in Brazil